Ficus variegata is a well distributed species of tropical fig tree. It occurs in many parts of Asia, islands of the Pacific and as far south east as Australia. There is a large variety of local common names including common red stem fig, green fruited fig and variegated fig. A non strangling fig which may reach 30 metres in height. The tree is evergreen when young but becomes briefly deciduous as it grows older.  In Australia the fruit are eaten by cassowaries and double-eyed fig parrots.

Ficus variegata is dioecious, with male and female flowers produced on separate individuals.

Taxonomy
Ficus variegata has been described by Carl Ludwig Blume in 1825. In 1965, E. J. H. Corner updated the species by putting some other Ficus in synonymy with F. variegata varieties. Five were listed: F. variegata var. variegata distributed on all the species range, F. variegata var. chlorocarpa from South China, Hainan Island and Thailand, F. variegata var. garciae described as inhabitant of the Pacific Islands (Ryukyu islands, Taiwan and Philippines), F. variegata var. ilangoides in Luzon and northern Borneo, and F. variegata var. sycomoroides in the Philippines and Borneo.
Recently, all the varieties have been synonymized under Ficus variegata.
Ficus variegata belongs to the subgenus Sycomorus section Sycomorus subsection Neomorphe.

Ecology
Ficus variegata is pollinated by fig wasps from the genus Ceratosolen as are all the fig species from the subgenus Sycomorus. 
The figs of Ficus variegata have been reported to be eaten by 41 animal species (5 birds, 15 bats, 7 monkeys, 7 marsupials):

 Southern cassowary
 Blyth's hornbill
 Yellow-crested cockatoo
 Double-eyed fig parrot
 Japanese white-eye
 Common echymipera
 Long-nosed echymipera
 Raffray's bandicoot
 Ground cuscus
 Northern common cuscus
 Stein's cuscus
 Common spotted cuscus
 Lesser short-nosed fruit bat
 Horsfield's fruit bat
 Greater short-nosed fruit bat
 Indonesian short-nosed fruit bat
 New Guinea naked-backed fruit bat
 Lesser naked-backed fruit bat
 Long-tongued fruit bat
 Broad-striped tube-nosed fruit bat
 Common tube-nosed fruit bat
 Eastern tube-nosed bat
 Lesser tube-nosed fruit bat
 Greater musky fruit bat
 Great flying fox
 Geoffroy's rousette
 Common blossom bat
 Celebes crested macaque
 Javan surili
 Red-shanked douc
 Lar gibbon
 Silvery gibbon
 Agile gibbon
 Bornean orangutan
 Black rat

References

variegata
Trees of China
Trees of Taiwan
Trees of Thailand
Trees of Malesia
Trees of Australia
Flora of Queensland
Flora of the Ryukyu Islands
Dioecious plants